A Karzer was a designated lock-up or detention room to incarcerate students as a punishment, within the jurisdiction of some institutions of learning in Germany and German-language universities abroad. Karzers existed both at universities and at gymnasiums (similar to a grammar school) in Germany until the beginning of the 20th century. Marburg's last Karzer inmate, for example, was registered as late as 1931. 
Responsible for the administration of the Karzer was the so-called Pedell (English: bedel), or during later times Karzerwärter (a warden). While Karzer arrest was originally a severe punishment, the respect for this punishment diminished with time, particularly in the 19th century, as it became a matter of honour to have been incarcerated at least once during one's time at university. At the end of the 19th century, as the students in the cell became responsible for their own food and drink and the receiving of visitors became permitted, the "punishment" would often turn into a social occasion with excessive consumption of alcohol.

Karzers have been preserved at the universities of Heidelberg, Jena, Marburg, Freiburg, Tübingen, Freiberg (School of Mines), Greifswald, Göttingen, Friedrich-Alexander-Universität Erlangen-Nürnberg in Erlangen, and at Tartu, Estonia. The Karzer in Göttingen was known, after the Pedell Brühbach, as Hotel de Brühbach; it was moved in the 19th century, because of the extension of the university library,  to the Aula building; a cell door, preserved from the old Karzer, shows graffiti by Otto von Bismarck. Bearing witness to how the students spent the time in the cell are the many memorable wall, table and door graffiti left by students in the cells and today shown as tourist attractions in the older German universities.

Literature
 Mark Twain, A Tramp Abroad. (With reference to the Karzer at Heidelberg University).
 Mooney, Carolyn J.: Notes from Academe: Germany. Slammer or Shrine? How German Students Left Their Mark on the Walls of a Campus Prison. In: The Chronicle of Higher Education, March 1, 1996, A 55. [Göttingen].
 Der Heidelberger Studentenkarzer. Text: Andrew Cowin. Editor: Universität Heidelberg. Heidelberg [2011].
 Hahne, Gert: Der Karzer: Bier! Unschuld! Rache! Der Göttinger Universitätskarzer und seine Geschichte(n). Göttingen 2005.
 Bickert, Hans Günther / Nail, Norbert: Marburger Karzer-Buch. Kleine Kulturgeschichte des Universitätsgefängnisses. Dritte, neu bearbeitete und vermehrte Auflage. Marburg 2013.
 http://www.bonner-rechtsjournal.de/fileadmin/pdf/Artikel/2010_02/BRJ_260_2010_Bernoth.pdf Karzer of the University of Bonn

External links
 The Karzer of Friedrich-Alexander-Universität Erlangen-Nürnberg
 Karzer of Technische Universität Freiberg
 The Karzer of the University of Göttingen
 The Karzer of  Ernst-Moritz-Arndt- Universität Greifswald
 The Karzer of the University of Heidelberg
 The Karzer of the University of Jena
  The former Karzer of the University of Leipzig
 The Karzer of Philipps-Universität Marburg
 German Text: The Karzer of Albert-Ludwigs-Universität Freiburg
 The Karzer of the University of Tübingen
 The Karzer of the 'Evangelisches Stift' Tübingen 
 The Karzer of the University of Tartu (Estonia)
 Karzer of the former Polytechnicum Riga (Latvia)
The final two lock-ups had been established in the manner and tradition of German campus prisons.

Academic culture
Student societies in Germany
Museums in Germany
History of education in Germany
Legal history of Germany
School punishments
Education museums